Kitui County is a county in the former Eastern Province of Kenya. Its capital and largest town is Kitui, although Mwingi is also another major urban centre. The county has a population of 1,136,187 (2019 census). and an area of 30,430 km2. It lies between latitudes 0°10 South and 3°0 South and longitudes 37°50 East and 39°0 East.

Kitui County shares its borders with seven counties; Tharaka-Nithi and Meru to the north, Embu to the northwest, Machakos and Makueni to the west, Tana River to the east and southeast, and Taita-Taveta to the south.

History
The name Kitui means 'a place where iron goods are made'. The Kamba iron-smiths who settled in the county many years before the colonial period are the ones who named the area Kitui.

Demographics
Kitui county has a total population of 1,136,187 of which 549,003 are males, 587,151 females and33 intersex persons. There are 262,942 household with an average household size of 4.3 persons per household and a population density 37 people per square kilometre. 

Source 

The population is mostly made up of people of the Akamba ethnicity. Tharaka people, a section of the Ameru, are also found in Kitui County mainly in Tharaka ward. There is also a growing Somali presence.

Administration and Political Units

Administrative Units 
There are eight sub counties, forty county assembly wards, one hundred and sixty seven locations and four hundred and eleven sub-locations.

Further, the sub-counties are divided into smaller units called wards. There are 40 wards which are further divided into 247 villages.

Administrative Sub-Counties 

 Kitui West Sub-County  
 Kitui Central Sub-County.
 Kitui Rural Sub-County. 
 Kitui South Sub-County.
 Kitui East Sub-County.
 Mwingi North Sub-County.
 Mwingi West Sub-County.
 Mwingi Central Sub-County
Source

Electoral Constituencies 

 Kitui Central Constituency
 Kitui East Constituency
 Kitui Rural Constituency
 Kitui South Constituency
 Kitui West Constituency
 Mwingi Central Constituency
 Mwingi North Constituency
 Mwingi West Constituency

Source

Political Leadership 
Charity Kaluki Ngilu is the governor and second to hold office after Julius Malombe and she is deputised by Gideon Nzau Wathe.Enoch Kiio Wambua is the senator join office in 2017 after unseating the first senator David Musila. Irene Muthoni Kasalu is the women representative and second holder of this office after Nyiva Mwendwa.

For Kitui County, the County Executive Committee comprises:-

kSource

Members of Parliament 2017-2022 (Kitui County) 

Hon. Mulu, Benson Makali of Wiper Democratic Party Kenya Member of Parliament Kitui Central Constituency
 Hon. Mbai, Nimrod Mbithuka of Jubilee Party Member of Parliament Kitui East Constituency
 Hon. Mboni, David Mwalika of chama cha uma party Member of Parliament Kitui Rural Constituency
 Hon. Nyamai, Rachael Kaki of Jubilee Party Member of Parliament Kitui South Constituency
 Hon. Nyenze, Edith of Wiper Democratic Party Kenya Member of Parliament Kitui West Constituency
 Hon. Mulyungi, Gideon Mutemi of Wiper Democratic Party Kenya Member of Parliament Mwingi Central Constituency
 Hon. Nzengu, Paul Musyimi of Wiper Democratic Party of Kenya Member of Parliament Mwingi North Constituency
 Hon. Nguna, Charles Ngusya of Wiper Democratic Party of Kenya Member of Parliament Mwingi West Constituency

Education 
There are 1826 ECD centres 1099 primary schools and 384 secondary schools. The county has also 5 teachers training colleges, 311 adult training institutions and 1 technical training institutions.

Source

Health 
There are a total of 256 health facilities in the county with one county referral hospital. County has 2,084 health personnel of different cadre.

HIV prevalence is at 4.2% below the national 5.9%.

Source

Major towns
Major towns in the county include Kitui, Mwingi, Mutomo, Kwa Vonza, Mutitu, Ikutha, Kabati, Migwani, Mutonguni, Mbitini and Kyuso.

Climate

The climate is semi-arid; it receives roughly 71 cm (28 inches). A significant point however is that rainfall occurs practically only during the rainy seasons (one long around March & April, and one short, around October, November and December). The terms Long and Short Rains has nothing to do with amount of rainfall received but rather on the length of the rainy seasons.

Urbanisation
 Source: OpenDataKenya

Education
There are 1826 ECD centres 1476 primary schools and 384 secondary schools. The county has also 5 teachers training colleges, 311 adult training institutions and 1 technical training institutions.

Source

Kitui School and Muthale Girls are the only national schools in Kitui County. Other major secondary schools are St. Charles Lwanga Secondary School, Kyuso Boys Sec, St. Joseph's Seminary at Mwingi, St, Benedict Ikutha Boys' high school, Kisasi Boys' Secondary School, Matinyani Boys' Secondary, Mutonguni Secondary School, St. Luke's Yatta Boys' Secondary School, Katheka boys high school (St Aquinas) Mutito Boys' Secondary School and Mwingi Boys' Secondary School. Major girls' schools include Mulango Girls' High School, St. Angela's High School, Mbitini Girls' Secondary School, Chuluni Girls' Secondary School, Mutito Girls' Secondary School and Mutomo Girls' Secondary School. Other notable secondary schools are St.Ursula Girls-Tungutu, St. Aquinas Kyangwithya Boys, Nzambani Boys, Maliku Girls, Thitani Girls, Zombe Girls, Migwani Boys, Katheka Boys, Kabaa secondary school and St. Lawrence Kaluva Secondary School

Kathungi Secondary School, which is also found in Kitui County, is famous for its football championship in the country. Kathungi were the 2013 national silver medalists. Alongside the national champions Upper Hill, they represented Kenya in East Africa Secondary School games held in Lira, Uganda.

South Eastern Kenya University is a public university located in Kitui with the Main Campus at Kwa Vonza and other campuses at Mwingi and Kitui towns. Kenyatta University has a campus at Kwa Vonza while Moi University has a campus at Kyuso in Mwingi North sub-county. University of Nairobi also has a campus in Kitui town. Kenya Medical Training College has campuses in Kitui and Mwingi.

Statistics
 Source: USAid Kenya

Health
There are a total of 256 health facilities in the county with one county referral hospital. County has 2,084 health personnel of different cadre.

HIV prevalence is at 4.2% below the national 5.9%.

Source 

Kitui County has several hospitals and health centres to meet the health needs of residents, among them Kitui County Referral Hospital, Mwingi Sub-County General Hospital, Kitui Nursing Home, Neema Hospital, Jordan Hospital, mission-run hospitals such as Muthale Mission hospital and some private health centres.

Economy
The vast majority of the economy is based on sustenance farming, despite the fact that the agriculture is an extremely challenging endeavor giving the sporadic rainfall. A logical move therefore would be a transition to non-agricultural industries.

During a recent, informal survey of the businesses in the town of Ikutha in southern Kitui County, the following businesses were identified:

Butcheries
Food Staples (rice, corn meal)
Mini-markets (sells things like Coca-Cola, potato chips, bread, long-shelf milk)
Mechanics
Pubs
Hotels and restaurants

Industries
Situated in Kitui town is a cotton ginnery where cotton farmers from around the county can deliver their harvest. It is the only major industry in the region, and was set up way back in 1935. Kitui is a semi-arid region and not many crops fare well there apart from cotton, hence the ginnery plays a major role creating income for the many cotton farmers in the region.

Minerals
Kitui county has large deposits of coal in Mui Basin, having low energy content/calorific value, meaning it produces less heat when burned. It also has sulphur. The coal could potentially supply the 1,000 MW Lamu Coal Power Station, and the 960-megawatt (MW) Kitui coal plant.

Mutomo/Ikutha district contains limestone.

Wealth/Poverty Level
 Source: OpenDataKenya Worldbank

Tourism
Tsavo East National Park
South Kitui National Reserve
Mwingi National Reserve
Ikoo Valley
Ngomeni Rock Catchment.

Nzambani Rock

Also in Kitui county is one of the largest Rock outcrops in Kenya which is locally known as "Ivia ya Nzambani". Situated past Kitui Town, about 1 km from Chuluni Market is the Nzambani Rock which is famous for the tales and myths of its origin. Activities here include hiking and rock climbing.

Religion and traditional culture
Christianity is the dominant religion in Kitui County. Roman Catholics make about 15% of the county's population. Other Christian denominations in the county include The Africa Brotherhood Church (ABC), the African Inland Church (AIC), Anglican Church of Kenya (ACK), Presbyterian Church of East Africa (PCEA), Independent Presbyterian Church (IPC), Redeemed Gospel Church and many others. Kitui county has a significant number of Muslims and several mosques can be spotted around the county's major urban centres. Few people in the county still hold on to traditional beliefs. They believe in a god called Mulungu or Ngai - the creator of everything on Earth.

Notable people

 Willy Mutunga,  Former Chief Justice of Kenya
 Kalonzo Musyoka,  10th Vice-President of Kenya
 Julius Malombe,  The first Governor of Kitui County
 Makau W. Mutua,  Former dean of the University of Buffalo Law School 
 Charity Ngilu,  Former MP Kitui Central (The current Governor of Kitui County)
 David Musila,   Former Member of Parliament of Kitui West Constituency 
 Nzamba Kitonga,  Former president of the East Africa Law Society and COMESA Court of Justice
 Kiema Kilonzo,  Kenyan ambassador to Turkey
 Eric Mutua,  Former chairman of the Law Society of Kenya and Treasurer of the East Africa Law Society
 Onesmus Kimweli Mutungi,  Former Chancellor of Kenyatta University and the first Kenyan to get Doctor of Law degree
 Ngala Mwendwa,  Former Minister of Labour in the first Kenyan post-independence cabinet
 Nyiva Mwendwa,  The first Kitui County Woman Representative and first Kenyan woman to serve as a cabinet minister
 Kitili Maluki Mwendwa,  First black Chief Justice of Kenya
 Benson Masya,  Kenyan long distance runner and marathon serial winner and the winner of the inaugural IAAF World Half Marathon Championships in 1992 
 Benjamin Nzimbi,  Retired Archbishop and Primate of the Anglican Church of Kenya
 Musili Wambua,  Associate Dean of the University of Nairobi School of Law and the first Chancellor of University of Embu
 John Nzau Mwangangi,  Kenyan long distance runner and the gold medalist at the 2011 African Cross Country Championships

See also
Kasioni
Machakos County
Makueni County
Tana River County
Taita Taveta County
Embu County
Meru County
Tharaka Nithi County

References

External links

Kitui County official website
Visit Kitui website

 
Counties of Kenya